McCalman is a surname. Notable people with the surname include:

Ben McCalman (born 1988), Australian rugby union player
Don McCalman, Scottish football player and manager
Iain McCalman, Australian academic and historian
James T. McCalman (1914–1977), American politician
Janet McCalman, Australian social historian
Macon McCalman (1932–2005), American actor
Max McCalman, American cheesemaker and writer

See also
Calman, surname
The McCalmans, a Scottish folk music group
McCalman Peak, a mountain in Antarctica